Zuideinde is a hamlet in the Dutch province of Overijssel. It is located in the municipality of Kampen, about 8 km south of that city. A part of the hamlet is located in Oldebroek, Gelderland.

Even though it still has its own place name signs, it is considered part of Kamperveen. In 1840, it was home to 159 people. Nowadays, it consists of about 125 houses. 

In 1595, the Huis Wittenstein was built in Zuideinde by Johan Witten. In 1615, it became a havezate (manor house). It was demolished in 1938, and replaced by a new building.

References

Populated places in Gelderland
Populated places in Overijssel
Kampen, Overijssel
Oldebroek